Robert Lechleiter (born 1 July 1980 in Rosenheim) is a former German professional footballer who played as a striker.

References

1980 births
Living people
People from Rosenheim
Sportspeople from Upper Bavaria
Association football forwards
German footballers
Footballers from Bavaria
SpVgg Unterhaching players
FC Hansa Rostock players
VfR Aalen players
2. Bundesliga players
3. Liga players